Oriental Bank, otherwise known as Oriental Bank Plc. or Oriental Bank Cambodia, is a commercial bank in Cambodia. The bank was established in 2021 by founder, managing director and CEO — Datuk Phan Ying Tong and other partners. Oriental Bank received their approval in principal from the National Bank of Cambodia on the ninth of December 2020  The banking operation license was received from the National Bank of Cambodia in January of 2022, and were officially presented to them on the 28th of February 2022, by the Governor of the National Bank of Cambodia, H.E Dr. Chea Chanto.

See also
List of banks in Cambodia

References

External links

Banks of Cambodia
Banks established in 2021
Cambodian companies established in 2021